7 Street SW station is a CTrain light rail station in downtown Calgary, Alberta, Canada. It is used only by westbound trains, with the nearest stations serving east bound trains being 6 Street SW station and 8 Street SW station, both of which only serve eastbound trains. The station platform is located on the north side of 7 Avenue South, within the free fare zone of the CTrain and serves both routes 201 and 202.

The original 7 Street W station was located between 7 Street & 8 Street SW (adjacent to the Sandman Hotel) and opened on May 25, 1981, as part of Calgary's original LRT line from 8 Street W to Anderson. On February 27, 2009, the new 7 Street W station opened one block East (between 6 Street & 7 Street SW) and the old platform was immediately closed and demolished shortly afterwards.

Like all refurbished 7 Avenue platforms, the entire sidewalk slopes up to the station at both ends and the platform can handle 4-car trains.

The station registered an average of 12,400 weekday boardings in 2005.

In 2008, according to the Calgary Transit Website, the daily weekday ridership remains at an unchanged rate of 12,400 boardings.

References

CTrain stations
Railway stations in Canada opened in 1981